Mount Meeks is a mountain,  high, surmounting the rocky divide between Griffith Glacier and Howe Glacier, in the Queen Maud Mountains of Antarctica. It was mapped by the United States Geological Survey from surveys and U.S. Navy air photos, 1960–63, and was named by the Advisory Committee on Antarctic Names for Lieutenant Harman T. Meeks of U.S. Navy Squadron VX-6, a navigator on aircraft during Operation Deep Freeze 1966 and 1967.

References

Mountains of Marie Byrd Land